Sundadanio atomus is a danionin in the family Cyprinidae. It is endemic to Singkep, off Sumatra (Indonesia). It lives in peat swamp forests.

Sundadanio atomus reaches a maximum size of  standard length.

References

Sundadanio
Freshwater fish of Sumatra
Endemic fauna of Sumatra
Taxa named by Kevin W. Conway
Taxa named by Maurice Kottelat
Taxa named by Heok Hui Tan
Fish described in 2011